Battle Through the Heavens is a 2018 Chinese television series adapted from the eponymous novel Doupo Cangqiong (斗破苍穹) by Tiancan Tudou (天蚕土豆). It stars Leo Wu, Lin Yun, Baron Chen, Li Qin, Xin Zhilei and Liu Meitong.  The series aired on Hunan TV on September 3, 2018 till October 25, 2018.

Synopsis
Xiao Yan (Leo Wu) is the son of Xiao Zhan (Yu Rongguang) and Gu Wenxin (Carman Lee). When Xiao Yan was nine, his mother was killed by enemies and his father never talked about it. Until he was fifteen years old, his martial art has made no progress due to his mother's ring absorbing all his progress. One day, Xiao Yan encounters the old man Yao Chen (Baron Chen) after making contact with the ring. With the help of Yao Chen, Xiao Yan makes great advances in martial arts, and learns of the main instigator the death of his mother. Xiao Yan enrolls for the Jianan Academy and makes friends there. Once he is framed and narrowly escaped, he finds that his family have been doomed. In order to revenge for the murder of his mother, but also for the justice of Jianghu, Xiao Yan resolutely chose a single person to challenge the forces of evil.

Cast

Main

 Leo Wu (Shi Xiaosong (young) ) as Xiao Yan
 A martial arts genius. Younger son of the Xiao family, Disciple of the Medicine Lord. Lost his abilities at the age of nine after his mother's death but soon makes great advances after his encounter with his teacher, Yao Chen.
 Lin Yun as Xiao Xun'er
 Descendant of the Gu tribe.She was adopted by Xiao Yan's family since young and is loyal toward him. She has had a crush on Xiao Yan since their childhood due to Xiao Yan sneaking into her room to use his Dou Qi to strengthen her bones. Becomes the Dragon Mother of the Gu Clan.
 Baron Chen as Yao Chen
 The Medicine Lord, previous master of Xing Yun pavilion. Xiao Yan's teacher. Also Xiao Yan's Mother's former teacher.
 Li Qin as Xiao Yixian
 Daughter of the Ice King. Xiao Yan's bosom friend. She has a body filled with different kind of poison.
 Xin Zhilei as Medusa
 Queen of the Snake tribe.
 Liu Meitong as Nalan Yanran
 Descendant of Nalan tribe. Young mistress of Yunlan sect. Xiao Yan's former fiancee, who canceled their engagement after he lost his abilities. However, she accepted a three year agreement from Xiao Yan to fight for their respective clan's prides.

Supporting

Jianan Academy

 Su Qianwei as Ruo Lin
 Grandmaster of Taidou. Xiao Yan and Xiao Xuner's teacher. Known for her beauty and good morals.
 Ling Xiaosu as Han Feng
 Master of Xing Yun pavilion. Elder of Jianan Academy. Yao Chen's disciple. Traitor working alongside the Soul Hall and causing Xiao Yan's Mother's death.
 Xiao Zhan as Lin Xiuya
 Leader of the "Wolf Teeth" forces. He is skilled in hunting magical beasts.
 Wu Jiacheng as Hao Tian
 Known as "Bloody Sword". A talent at refining medicine.
 Peng Chuyue as Han Xian
 Leader of the Medicine sect and then member of the Yan Sect.
 Gu Jiacheng as Hu Jia
 The character in the novel was the grand-daughter of the vice-principal of Jianan Academy, known as "Demon Girl". Changed to a male in the television adaptation.
 Hua Cheng as Bai Cheng
 Arrogant Senior Disciple who despises Xiao Yan.

Xiao Tribe

 Yu Rongguang as Xiao Zhan
 Leader of Xiao tribe. Xiao Yan's father.
 Li Shen as Xiao Ding
 Xiao Yan's elder brother. Leader of Mo Tie army, a group of outlaws who fight for good.
 Yan Xi as Xiao Li
 Xiao Yan's second brother and Vice-Leader of Mo Tie Army.

Gu Tribe

 Carman Lee as Gu Wenxin
 Xiao Yan's mother; Yao Chen's disciple. Forced to commit suicide after being falsely labelled as a Traitor
 Li Zifeng as Gu Yuan
 Gu Wenxin's brother; Xiao Xuner's father.
 Miao Yilun as Gu Tianyi
 Xiao Xuner's brother.

Nalan tribe (Yunlan Sect)

 Norman Chui as Nalan Jie
 Elder of Nalan tribe. Nalan Yanran's grandfather.
 Su Qing as Yun Yun
 Eldest disciple of Yunlan Sect. Nalan Yanran's teacher.
 Zeng Jiang as Yun Shan
 Former leader of Yun Lan sect. Yun Yun's teacher.
 Cheng Haofeng as Gu He
 Number one medicine practitioner of the world. Elder of Yun Lan sect. Yun Yun's admirer.

Mite'er tribe

 Qiu Xinzhi as Hai Bodong
 One of the top ten experts of Jia Ma Empire. Grand elder of Mite'er tribe. Known as the "Ice King". Xiao Yixian's father.
 Zhu Xiaoyu as Mi Tengshan
 Leader of Mite'er tribe and Elder of Jianan Academy.

Snake tribe

 Du Chun as Mobasi
 Leader of Snake Tribe.
 Xu Kelong as Qing Lin
 Female general of Snake tribe.

Others

 Guo Xiaofeng as Fa Ma
 Imperial advisor of Chuyun kingdom.
 Chen Zexi as Ye Lan
 Crown prince of Chuyun kingdom.
 Guo Ziyu as Fan Ling
 Leader of Blood Sect.
 Miao Haojun as Ge Ye
 Gong Rui as Yun Zhen
 Dou Bolin as Mo Li
 Wang Wanjuan

Production

Casting
On January 16, 2017, it was announced that Leo Wu will play the leading role of Xiao Yan. The role of Xiao Xun'er, the female lead, was announced to be portrayed by Lin Yun.

Filming
Principal photography started on January 16, 2017 and took place in various locations including Hengdian World Studios, Xiangshan World Studio, Yunnan, Duyun. The series ended filming in July 2017.

Soundtrack

Awards and nominations

Ratings
In this table,  represent the lowest ratings and  represent the highest ratings.

References

External links
Dau Pha Thuong Khung Vietnamese version
 

Xianxia television series
2018 Chinese television series endings
Television shows based on Chinese novels
2018 Chinese television series debuts
Television series by New Classics Media